Before the Holocaust, Jews were a significant part of the population in Lithuania where they numbered around 240,000, including approximately 100,000 in Vilnius, or about 45% of that city's pre-World War II population (Vilnius was also once known as the "Jerusalem of Lithuania"). A large Jewish community also existed in Latvia. In comparison, Estonia and the Nordic countries have had much smaller communities, concentrated mostly in Denmark and Sweden. The following is a list of prominent North European Jews, arranged by country of origin:

Denmark 

 Mogens Ballin, painter
 Victor Bendix, composer, conductor and pianist
 Susanne Bier, film director
 Kim Bodnia, actor
 Harald Bohr, mathematician and footballer (Jewish mother)
 Niels Bohr, physicist, Nobel Prize (1922) (Jewish mother)
 Victor Borge, entertainer
 Edvard Brandes, politician, critic and author, minister of finance from 1909 to 1910
 Ernst Brandes, economist and editor
 Georg Brandes, author and critic, father of Danish naturalism
 Marcus Choleva, chief executive officer of KFI
 Dagmar Cohn, illustrator
 Esther Gehlin, painter
 Meïr Aron Goldschmidt, author and editor
 Heinrich Hirschsprung, industrialist, art patron (Den Hirschsprungske Samling)
 Arne Jacobsen, architect and designer (Jewish mother)
 Abraham Kurland, Olympic wrestling medalist
 Arne Melchior, politician and former Transport Minister and Minister for Communication and Tourism
 Marcus Melchior, chief rabbi of Denmark, father of Arne Melchior
 Michael Melchior, rabbi and Israeli politician
 Ivan Osiier, seven-time Olympic fencer
 Lee Oskar, harmonica player, member of War
 Herbert Pundik, journalist
 Raquel Rastenni, jazz and popular singer
 Edgar Rubin, Gestalt psychologist
 Dan Zahavi, philosopher
 Nikolaj Znaider, violinist, conductor

Estonia

 Jüri Alperten (1957–2020), conductor, pianist and music teacher
 Eino Baskin (1929–2015), actor and theatre director
 Avi Benjamin (born 1959), composer
 Ben Berlin (1896–1944), jazz musician
 Maria Dangell (born 1974), singer and pianist
 Aaron Feinstein, chess player
 Moses Wolf Goldberg (1905–1964), chemist
 Heinrich Gutkin (1879–1941), businessman and politician
 Idel Jakobson (1904–1997), NKVD investigator
 Louis Kahn (1901–1974), architect
 Anna Klas (1912–1999), pianist
 Eri Klas (1939–2016), conductor
 Mihhail Lotman (born 1952), philologist and politician
 Juri Lotman (1922–1993), semiotician
 Zara Mints (1927–1990), literary scientist
 Vladimir Padwa (1900–1981), pianist and composer
 Ita Saks (1921–2003), translator and publicist
 Hagi Šein (born 1945), journalist, film director, screenwriter and professor
 Benno Schotz (1891–1984), sculptor
 Samuel H. Shapiro (1907–1987), politician
 Emmanuel Steinschneider (1886–1970), physician
 Leonid Stolovich (1929–2013), philosopher
 David Vseviov (born 1949), historian

Finland 

 Mathilda Berwald, singer
 Max Dimont, historian and author
 Ida Ekman, soprano singer
 Abba Gindin, Finnish-born Israeli football player
 Kim Hirschovits, ice hockey player
 Ruben Jaari, businessman
 Max Jakobson, diplomat
 Wolf Karni, football referee
 Daniel Katz, writer
 Elias Katz, athlete, Olympic medalist
 Salomon Klass (1907–1985), Finnish Army captain
 Roni Porokara, football player
 Boris Rotenberg, football player
 Marion Rung, pop singer
 Elis Sella, actor
 Seela Sella, actress
 Mauritz Stiller, director
 Uniikki, rapper
 Sam Vanni, painter
 Poju Zabludowicz, business magnate
 Ben Zyskowicz, conservative leader

Iceland 

 Vladimir Ashkenazy, pianist
 Bobby Fischer, chess player (Jewish mother, but did not self-identify as a Jew; American expatriate, Icelandic)
 Dorrit Moussaieff, First Lady of Iceland
 Sruli Recht, award-winning designer

Latvia 

 Elya Baskin, actor
 Isaiah Berlin, historian of ideas
 Lipman Bers, mathematician and activist
 David Bezmozgis, author
 Boris Brutskus
 Sergei Eisenstein, film director
 Movsas Feigins, chess player
 Morris Halle, linguist
 Philippe Halsman, photographer
 Joseph Hirshhorn, financier and philanthropist
 Abraham Zevi Idelsohn, Jewish musicologist
 Hermann Jadlowker, musician (born at Riga)
 Mariss Jansons, conductor (Jewish mother)
 Gil Kane, comic book illustrator
 Alexander Koblencs, chess player
 Abraham Isaac Kook, rabbi
 Gidon Kremer, violinist; father was a Jewish Holocaust survivor
 Nechama Leibowitz
 Yeshayahu Leibowitz
 Hermanis Matisons, chess player
 Mischa Maisky, cellist
 Solomon Mikhoels, actor
 Aron Nimzowitsch, chess player
 Arkady Raikin, performing artist
 Yosef Rosen, der Rogatchover Gaon
 Mark Rothko, painter
 Judith Shklar, political philosopher
 Meir Simcha of Dvinsk, rabbi
 Mikhail Tal, world chess champion
 Max Weinreich, linguist

Lithuania 

 Semyon Alapin (1856–1923), chess player
 Mark Antokolsky (1840–1902), sculptor to Tzar Alexander II of Russia
 Moshe Arens (1925–2019), former Minister of Defence and former Minister of Foreign Affairs of Israel
 Aaron Barak (born 1936), President of the Supreme Court of Israel
 Saul Bellow (1915–2005), writer and laureate of the Nobel Prize for Literature (1976)
 Eliezer Ben-Yehuda (1858–1922), reviver of Hebrew
 Bernard Berenson (1865–1959), art critic
 Izis Bidermanas (1911–1980), photographer
 Reuben Asher Braudes (1851–1902), Hebrew-language novelist and journalist
 Victor David Brenner (1871–1924), designer of the US penny
 Eli Broad (1933–2021), American philanthropist and investor; founder of KB Home
 Sir Montague Burton, British retailer
 Abraham Cahan (1860–1951), writer and activist
 Leonard Cohen (1934–2016), musician, poet
 David Cronenberg (born 1943), film director
 Eliyahu Eliezer Dessler (1892–1953), rabbi, Talmudic scholar
 Simeon Dimanstein (1886–1938), Soviet Commissar of Nationalities
 Bob Dylan (born 1941), singer-songwriter, artist, writer
 Ilya Ehrenburg (1891–1967), one of the most prolific and well-known writers during the Soviet Union
 Nosson Tzvi Finkel, Orthodox Judaism leader
 Vyacheslav Ganelin (born 1944), jazz musician
 Sara Ginaite (born 1924), former resistance fighter, now Canadian academic
 Romain Gary, novelist, the Prix Goncourt (twice)
 Morris Ginsberg, sociologist
 Louis Ginzberg, scholar of the Talmud
 Philip Glass, music composer
 Leah Goldberg, poet
 Emma Goldman, political activist
 Nahum Goldmann, world Jewish leader
 Chaim Grade, writer
 Iosif Grigulevich, secret agent, historian
 Zvi Griliches, economist
 Shira Gorshman, Zionist pioneer, writer
 Aryeh Leib ben Asher Gunzberg, rabbi
 Bernard Lown, scientist, Nobel prize winner
 Aron Gurwitsch, philosopher
 Laurence Harvey, actor
 Jascha Heifetz (1901–1987), widely regarded as the greatest violinist of the 20th century
 Sidney Hillman, political activist
 Shemp Howard (1895–1955), comedian and actor
 Moe Howard (1897–1975), comedian and actor
 Curly Howard (1903–1952), comedian and actor
 Jay M. Ipson, founder of the Virginia Holocaust Museum
 Leo Jogiches, revolutionary
 Al Jolson, singer, comedian, and actor
 Berek Joselewicz, colonel of the Polish Army
 Joseph Kagan, Baron Kagan, clothes manufacturer
 Yisrael Meir Kagan, rabbi
 Daniel Kahneman, psychologist, Nobel Prize (2002) (Lithuanian parents)
 Mordechai Kaplan, founder of Reconstructionist Judaism
 Shlomo Kleit, political activist
 Aaron Klug, chemist, Nobel Prize (1982)
 Gurwin Kopel (1923–1990), artist
 Lazare Kopelmanas, international law scholar
 Abba Kovner, poet, writer
 Abraham Dob Bär Lebensohn, writer
 Micah Joseph Lebensohn, writer
 Phoebus Levene, biochemist
 Emmanuel Levinas, philosopher
 Isaac Levitan, artist
 Bernard Lewis, historian
 Morris Lichtenstein, rabbi, founder of the Jewish Science
 Jacques Lipchitz, cubist sculptor
 Jay Lovestone, politician
 Alexander Ziskind Maimon, author and scholar of the Talmud
 Osip Mandelstam, poet librettist
 Abraham Mapu, novelist
 Isser Zalman Meltzer, rabbi
 Harvey Milk, gay politician in the U.S.
 Hermann Minkowski, mathematician
 Oskar Minkowski, physiologist
 Benjamin Netanyahu, Prime Minister of Israel
 Mitchell Parish (1900–1993), Lithuanian-born American lyricist
 Abram Rabinovich, chess player
 Bar Refaeli, Israeli supermodel, television host, actress, and businesswoman
 Willy Ronis, artist
 Eduardas Rozentalis, chess player
 Yisroel Salanter, rabbi, famed Talmudist
 Meyer Schapiro, art historian
 Alexander Schneider, violinist and conductor
 Lasar Segall, painter, engraver and sculptor
 Benjamin Schlesinger, American labor leader, former President of the International Ladies Garment Workers Union
 Ben Shahn, artist
 Esther Shalev-Gerz, artist
 Karl Shapiro, poet (Lithuanian parents)
 Sam, Lee and Jacob Shubert, theatre managers, producers (cf. Shubert Brothers)
 Joe Slovo, ANC activist
 Elijah ben Solomon, rabbi, The Gaon of Vilna
 Maximilian Steinberg, composer
 David Suchet, English actor
 Helen Suzman, anti-apartheid MP (Lithuanian parents)
 Isakas Vistaneckis, chess player
 Louis Washkansky, recipient of the world's first human heart transplant
 Uriel Weinreich, linguist
 David Wolfsohn, second President of World Zionist Organization
 Bluma Zeigarnik, psychologist and psychiatrist
 Emanuelis Zingeris, politician
 William Zorach, painter, sculptor and writer
 Louis Zukofsky, poet (Lithuanian parents)
 Benjamin Zuskin, actor

Norway 

 Bjørn Benkow, journalist, known for faking interviews
 Jo Benkow, President of the Parliament of Norway
 Carl Paul Caspari, professor in theology (Lutheranism)
 Leo Eitinger (born in Slovakia), professor of psychiatry at University of Oslo and Holocaust survivor, known mainly for his work on late-onset psychological trauma amongst Holocaust survivors
 Victor Goldschmidt, professor in mineralogy
 Salo Grenning, pen name Pedro, editorial cartoonists in Verdens Gang
 Berthold Grünfeld, specialist in psychiatry, and professor in social medicine until 1993
 Imre Hercz, physician and public debater
 Bente Kahan, Yiddish singer and actress
 Hermann Kahan, Holocaust survivor, activist
 Morten Levin, professor of organization and work science
 Robert Levin, pianist
 Oskar Mendelsohn, historian, known for his two-volume history of Norwegian Jews
 Charles Philipson, Supreme Court Justice Judge, Chairman of the Petroleum Law Committee, deputy chairman of the Petroleum Council and chairman of the Riksel Committee
 Moritz Rabinowitz, merchant, active in public debate against antisemitism and Nazism before World War II
 Øystein Wingaard Wolf, poet and author

Sweden 

 Olof Aschberg, businessman and banker
 Robert Aschberg, journalist, media executive, TV personality
 Amalia Assur, first female dentist in Sweden
 Lovisa Augusti, opera singer
 Jean-Pierre Barda, musician
 Mathilda Berwald, née Cohn, musician
 Sharon Bezaly, flute soloist
 Jerzy Einhorn, pathologist and politician
 Herbert Felix, entrepreneur
 Josef Frank, architect and designer
 Isaac Grünewald, artist
 Lars Gustafsson, writer and scholar
 Johan Harmenberg, épée fencer, Olympic fencing medalist
 Eli Heckscher, economist
 Aaron Isaac, businessman from Swedish Pomerania, pioneer in the history of Sweden's Jewish population
 Erland Josephson, actor and writer
 Ernst Josephson, painter
 Ragnar Josephson, writer and art historian
 Anne Kalmering, singer
 Joel Kinnaman, actor
 George Klein, pathologist and writer
 Oskar Klein, physicist
 Oscar Levertin, poet and literary historian
 Jacob Marcus, businessman, pioneer in the history of Sweden's Jewish population
 Rudolf Meidner, economist
 Hanna Pauli, painter
 Dominika Peczynski, musician
 Alexandra Rapaport, actress
 Marcel Riesz, mathematician
 Göran Rosenberg, journalist
 Bo Rothstein, political scientist
 Nelly Sachs, poet, Nobel Prize (1966)
 Jerzy Sarnecki, criminologist
 Harry Schein, writer and culture personality
 Leif Silbersky, lawyer and author
 Sara Sommerfeld, actress
 Ute Steyer, Sweden's first female rabbi
 Mauritz Stiller, director
 Marcus Storch, industrialist
 Peter Weiss, dramatist and writer

References 

North European Jews
 
 
 
 
 
 
 
 
Jews,North European